Department of Military Lands and Cantonments is a Bangladesh government department responsible for managing the military cantonment land. Farid Ahmed is the Director General of the Department of Military Lands and Cantonments.

History
Department of Military Lands and Cantonments was established on 15 August 1970 in Dhaka as a Directorate. It was fully upgraded to a department in 1982. The department manages the lands through three circles. The circles are North circle in Bogra, Central circle in Dhaka, and Eastern circle in Chittagong. Each cantonment is managed by a cantonment board.

On 20 April 2009, the Department of Military Lands and Cantonments sent a notice to Khaleda Zia, former Prime Minister of Bangladesh, to evict her cantonment residence which was given to her after the assassination of her husband, President Ziaur Rahman. Khaledia Zia challenged the notice at Bangladesh High court which ruled against her, stating that the allotment of the house inside Dhaka cantonment was illegal. On 14 November 2010 she vacated her house in Dhaka Cantonment.

List of Cantonment boards
Dhaka Cantonment Board
Comilla Cantonment Board
Savar Cantonment Board 
Chittagong Cantonment Board 
Jessore Cantonment Board 
Bogra Cantonment Board 
Gazipur Cantonment Board 
Rangpur Cantonment Board 
Saidpur Cantonment Board 
Rajshahi Cantonment Board 
Qadirabad Cantonment Board 
Jahanabad Cantonment Board 
Jalalabad Cantonment Board
Mymensingh Cantonment Board 
Shahid Salahuddin Cantonment Board

References

1970 establishments in East Pakistan
Organisations based in Dhaka
Government departments of Bangladesh